Nigel Glockler (born 24 January 1953) is an English musician, best known as the longtime drummer for the heavy metal band Saxon, which he first joined in 1981.

Career
Glockler began his musical career in 1980 as the drummer for the British band Krakatoa. In 1981 he joined
Toyah, a band fronted by singer Toyah Willcox. At the end of that year, he joined Saxon when previous drummer Pete Gill retired due to an injury. Glockler has been with Saxon since then, except for two temporary absences. He also occasionally plays bass and keyboards for the band.

Glockler first left Saxon in 1987 when he was invited by Steve Howe to join a reformed lineup of the supergroup GTR. That lineup did not release any albums though some songs appeared on later albums by other GTR members. Glockler then returned to Saxon in 1988. In the early-to-mid 1990s he contributed to the albums Turbulence by Steve Howe and Aqua by Asia, plus two albums by The Original Iron Men (featuring former Iron Maiden members Paul Di'Anno and Dennis Stratton). Glockler stayed with Saxon until 1998 when he was forced to temporarily retire due to neck injuries that impeded his drumming. 

After receiving medical treatment, Glockler was able to play drums again, first contributing to the album Mad Men and English Dogs with Saxon guitarist Doug Scarratt in 2001. Glockler again rejoined Saxon in 2005 upon the departure of drummer Jörg Michael, and remains with the band to the present day. In late 2014 he survived a brain aneurysm and several surgeries.

Equipment 
Glockler currently uses and endorses British Drum Co drums, Canopus snares, Remo drumheads, Wincent drumsticks and is also a longtime endorser of Paiste cymbals.

Discography

Saxon 
 1982: The Eagle Has Landed
 1983: Power & the Glory
 1984: Crusader
 1985: Innocence Is No Excuse
 1986: Rock the Nations
 1989: Rock 'n' Roll Gypsies
 1990: Greatest Hits Live! 
 1991: Solid Ball of Rock
 1992: Forever Free
 1995: Dogs of War    
 1996: The Eagle Has Landed Part II      
 1997: Unleash the Beast
 2006: The Eagle Has Landed – Part III
 2007: The Inner Sanctum
 2009: Into the Labyrinth
 2011: Call to Arms
 2012: Heavy Metal Thunder – Live: Eagles Over Wacken 
 2013: Sacrifice
 2015: Battering Ram
 2016: Let Me Feel Your Power
 2018: Thunderbolt
 2021: Inspirations
 2022: Carpe Diem

Asia 
 1992: Aqua
 1996: Archiva 1
 1996: Archiva 2

Toyah 
 1981: Anthem

Steve Howe 
 1991: Turbulence

References

Links
https://www.discogs.com/es/artist/285446-Nigel-Glockler
https://www.allmusic.com/artist/saxon-mn0000259800

English heavy metal drummers
Saxon (band) members
Living people
1953 births
People from Hove